The Judge John C. Flanagan Residence is a house in Peoria, Illinois, United States. The home was constructed for John C. Flanagan, a Philadelphia native, in 1837. The house was either part of an original  tract purchased by Flanagan's father or part of a  tract purchased by Flanagan when he came to Peoria in 1831. It is believed that Abraham Lincoln was once a guest in the home during the Lincoln-Douglas debates from 1854 to 1860. The building was added to the National Register of Historic Places on September 5, 1975.

The house is now operated by the Peoria Historical Society as the John C. Flanagan House Museum, a 19th-century period historic house museum.  The house also serves as the headquarters for the Peoria Chapter of the Daughters of the American Revolution.

Notes

External links
John C. Flanagan House Museum - Peoria Historical Society

Houses completed in 1837
National Register of Historic Places in Peoria County, Illinois
Buildings and structures in Peoria, Illinois
Historic house museums in Illinois
Museums in Peoria County, Illinois
Houses in Peoria County, Illinois
Tourist attractions in Peoria, Illinois
Houses on the National Register of Historic Places in Illinois